HFE may refer to:

 HFE (gene), a gene that encodes the Human hemochromatosis protein
 H-parameter model (hFE), the current gain of a bipolar junction transistor
 Health First Europe
 Hefei Luogang International Airport, in  Anhui, China, now defunct
 Hefei Xinqiao International Airport, in  Anhui, China
 Hello from Earth, an interstellar radio message
 Herschend Family Entertainment Corporation, an American entertainment company
 Hertford East railway station, in England
 Hidden Field Equations, a cryptosystem
 Horizontal Fiscal Equalisation, in Australia
 Human factors engineering
 Hydrofluoroether, a solvent